An outdoor bronze statue of Abraham Lincoln by Henry Kirke Brown is installed in Union Square in Manhattan, New York. The statue was sponsored by the Union League Club of New York.

Description and history
Cast in 1870 and dedicated on September 16 of that year, the statue was originally installed at the southwest corner of Union Square, where the statue of Mahatma Gandhi now stands. In 1875, a stone and bronze rail fence was constructed around the statue of Lincoln; the fence included an inscription of text from his second inaugural address, "with malice toward none; charity toward all." During the 1930 redesign of Union Square Park, the statue was moved to its current location, but the fence remained. The statue is in axial alignment with the Independence Flagstaff and George Washington. It was conserved in 1992.

See also

 1870 in art
 List of statues of Abraham Lincoln
 List of sculptures of presidents of the United States

References

External links
 

1870 establishments in New York (state)
1870 sculptures
Sculptures by Henry Kirke Brown
Bronze sculptures in Manhattan
Monuments and memorials in Manhattan
Monuments and memorials to Abraham Lincoln in the United States
Outdoor sculptures in Manhattan
Relocated buildings and structures in New York City
Statues in New York City
New York City
Union Square, Manhattan